Krystyn J. Van Vliet (born June 21, 1976) is an American engineer, currently the Michael (1949) and Sonja Koerner Professor of Materials Science and Engineering at Massachusetts Institute of Technology, where she also serves as the university's Associate Provost and Associate Vice President for Research.

Education 
Van Vliet received her Sc.B. degree in Materials Science and Engineering from Brown University in 1998. While an undergraduate at Brown, she suffered grave head injuries in a car accident, and fought successfully to regain her memory, judgment, speech and other communication skills.

Van Vliet earned her Ph.D. in Materials Science and Engineering from MIT in 2002.

Career 
Van Vliet became a faculty member at MIT in 2004.

References

External links 
 

Living people
MIT School of Engineering faculty
21st-century American engineers
1976 births

Brown University alumni
Massachusetts Institute of Technology alumni